This is a list of rulers of the Akan state of Akyem Kotoku.

See also 
Akan people
Ghana
Gold Coast
Lists of incumbents

Government of Ghana
Rulers
Lists of African rulers